Jana Strnadová (born 25 May 1972) is a Czech former professional tennis player.

Strnadová, a left-handed player, attained a career high singles ranking of 434 on the professional tour. In 1991 she featured in the doubles main draw of a WTA Tour tournament in Colorado partnering her younger sister Nicola.

From 1992 to 1996 she was an accomplished tennis player for Syracuse University, where she was an All-American for singles in 1994 and amassed a team record 202 combined career wins. Her sister Nicola was a teammate.

ITF finals

Doubles: 1 (0–1)

References

External links
 
  (includes incorrectly attributed doubles performances, belonging to Andrea Strnadová)

1972 births
Living people
Czech female tennis players
Czechoslovak female tennis players
Syracuse Orange athletes
College women's tennis players in the United States